Drakaea thynniphila, commonly known as narrow-lipped hammer orchid is a species of orchid endemic to the south–west of Western Australia. It is pollinated by a single species of male thynnid wasp using sexual deception. The orchid's labellum is similar in shape and scent to a flightless female thynnid wasp. It is one of the more common drakaeas and is easily distinguished from the other species. The tiny lumps on its leaf along with the long flower that lacks a swollen labellum are diagnostic.

Description 
Drakaea thynniphila is similar to others in the genus in that it has a single, ground hugging leaf and an underground tuber.

Its flower is also similar to those of other hammer orchids in that the labellum resembles a flightless female thynnid wasp, except that the labellum is longer, less swollen than those of other drakaeas and lacks spots. Narrow-lipped hammer orchids have a spine on the column. The insect-like labellum has a "head" about one-half to one-third long as the "body", is densely hairy and has two dark maroon lumps at its base. The rest of the labellum (representing the female "body" of the insect) is dark maroon in colour, has scattered hairs and the tip of the "abdomen" is in line with the rest of the labellum. Flowers appear from September to late November.

Taxonomy and naming 
Drakaea thynniphila was first formally described by Alex George in 1984 in Nuytsia. The specific epithet (thynniphila) is derived from the thynnid wasp and the Ancient Greek word φίλος (phílos) meaning “dear" or, "beloved”.

Distribution and habitat 
Narrow-lipped hammer orchid occurs from near Busselton to Albany. It grows in sand in open clearings in woodland and forest.

Conservation 
Drakaea thynniphila is classified as "not threatened" by the Western Australian Government Department of Parks and Wildlife.

References 

thynniphila
Orchids of Western Australia
Endemic orchids of Australia
Plants described in 1984
Endemic flora of Western Australia